The men's 5000 metres was the second-longest of the seven men's track races in the Athletics at the 1964 Summer Olympics program in Tokyo.  It was held on 16 October and 18 October 1964.  54 athletes from 35 nations entered, with 6 not starting the first round.  The first round was held on 16 October and the final on 18 October.

The world record holder Vladimir Kuts had retired five years earlier.  Defending champion Murray Halberg didn't make the final.  Halberg and Pyotr Bolotnikov had dominated the event the previous four years but neither was in the final.  The top runner of the year was Bob Schul from the Compton Invitational.   This was Kip Keino's first Olympic final, but he would gain fame four years later.

In the slow, strategic race held in a light rain on a muddy dirt track Michel Jazy was more of a 1500 meter runner and expected to be ready for a fast finish.  He kept himself in the lead or close to the lead throughout.  Schul found himself on the curb boxed in by a loping Keino who seemed to be marking the field on the outside of the pack that also included future world record holder Ron Clarke.  With 600 metres to go Bill Dellinger made the first move coming around the entire pack and into the lead.  At age 30, old for an amateur athlete in this era, Dellinger came out of retirement to make one last attempt after failing to make the Olympic final the previous two Olympiads.  Dellinger's move was marked by Jazy as the pace quickened.  Nikolay Dutov came around the entire pack to challenge Jazy and Dellinger.  Shortly after the bell, Jazy decided to take off, jumping to the lead with Harald Norpoth coming from mid pack to become his closest pursuer 5 metres back as the field stretched out.  A one speed runner, Clarke had no answer for the speedsters.  With 300 to go, Schul came from fifth place to start picking off runners to get to Norpoth with 200 to go.  Through the turn he passed Norpoth with Jazy constantly looking over his shoulder to check his pursuer.  Jazy still had a two metres lead as they reached the final straight.  But that lead disappeared rapidly as Schul sprinted by to take the gold medal.  Jazy now watched Norpoth as he slowly edged by just before the finish.  Given all he could, Jazy tried to maintain and glide across the finish line, but Dellinger, in full sprint, caught Jazy at the line to take the bronze medal.  It took officials a half an hour to decide the bronze medalist.

Schul's victory was the first and only American victory in the event.  His was only the second medal in the history of the event; Dellinger's bronze became the third.  It would be 52 years before USA would register another medal in the 5000, when Kenyan born Paul Chelimo took silver in 2016.

Results

First round

The top three runners in each of the 4 heats advanced.

First round, heat 1

First round, heat 2

First round, heat 3

First round, heat 4

Final

References

Athletics at the 1964 Summer Olympics
5000 metres at the Olympics
Men's events at the 1964 Summer Olympics